Ivonino is a rural locality (a village) in Volosatovskoye Rural Settlement, Selivanovsky District, Vladimir Oblast, Russia. The population was 10 as of 2010.

Geography 
Ivonino is located 19 km northwest from Krasnaya Gorbatka (the district's administrative centre) by road. Denisovo is the nearest rural locality.

References 

Rural localities in Selivanovsky District